The following highways are numbered 650:

Canada
Alberta Highway 650 (defunct)
 Ontario Highway 650
Saskatchewan Highway 650

Israel
Route 650 (Israel)

Turkey 
 , a north-south state road in Turkey running from Karasu, Sakarya Province to Antalya.

United States
 
 
 
 
 
 
  Virginia State Route 650 (Fairfax County)